Coby Garrett Brooks (born May 17, 1969) is the former president and CEO of Hooters, Inc. and Naturally Fresh, Inc. Brooks was promoted to these positions in 2003, three years before the death of his father, Hooters founder Robert H. Brooks.

After his father's death, Brooks gained a controlling interest in his father's companies and was named chairman of his father's estate. He became embroiled in a dispute with his father's widow, Tami, over the distribution of the elder Brooks' estate. Brooks was left 30 percent of his father's estate.

Brooks appeared on an episode of the CBS reality TV show Undercover Boss featuring Hooters on February 14, 2010. Brooks left Hooters after the sale of the company in 2011 and is now a franchisee of Twin Peaks, another "breastaurant" chain. Brooks also made a cameo alongside Twin Peaks CEO Randy DeWitt on another episode of Undercover Boss. After Brooks's departure from Hooters, he was replaced by Terrance M. Marks.

References

1969 births
Clemson University alumni
Hooters people
Living people
Businesspeople from Atlanta
Participants in American reality television series
American restaurateurs
American chief executives of food industry companies
21st-century American businesspeople
20th-century American businesspeople